Lenovo Vibe K4 Note is a midrange Android smartphone launched by Lenovo Group Limited in January 2016. The phone features a 5.5 inch FHD display powered by MediaTek MT6753 SoC processor. It comes with two storage variants of 16 and 32 GB with 2 GB of RAM, for A7010 model and 3 GB of RAM for A7010a48 model. It has a battery capacity rated at 3300mAh. The device supports Theater max technology with a VR headset. Upon its release in the market, it received positive feedbacks and reviews from all parts of the world unlike its bigger brother, Lenovo Vibe X3. Lenovo also launched its successor, K5 Note immediately after K4 Note's launch.

References

2.Lenovo Vibe K4 Note Price in India, Review, Full Specifications Mobile Review

Vibe K4 Note
Mobile phones introduced in 2016
Discontinued smartphones